Warrensville Heights High School is a public high school located in Warrensville Heights, Ohio (USA), east of Cleveland.  It is the only high school in the Warrensville Heights City School District and home of the Tigers.  The current school building was built in 1964 and renovated in 2002.

Ohio High School Athletic Association State Championships
 Boys Basketball - 2000

Notable alumni
 Arsenio Hall, TV personality 
 Sal Bando, Former MLB player (Oakland Athletics, Milwaukee Brewers) and Brewers General Manager
 Darnell Sanders, Former Ohio State Buckeye, Former NFL Tight End, Cleveland Browns, Atlanta Falcons, Chicago Bears
 Brad Sellers, Former Ohio State Buckeye, NBA Players, Chicago Bulls, Current Mayor of Warrensville Heights, Ohio
 Yvette Nicole Brown, Actress, singer, comedian
 David Patterson, American Football Player for the Atlanta Falcons

Notes and references

External links
 Warrensville Heights High School
 District Website

High schools in Cuyahoga County, Ohio
Public high schools in Ohio
1964 establishments in Ohio
Educational institutions established in 1964